Ghetto Guide is the debut solo album of rapper Saint Dog released on February 24, 2004, with Suburban Noize Records.

Track listing

Personnel
Little Brother (bass guitar)
Mark Twang (guitars)

References 

2004 debut albums
Saint Dog albums
Suburban Noize Records albums